The Design Council, formerly the Council of Industrial Design, is a United Kingdom charity incorporated by royal charter. Its stated mission is "to champion great design that improves lives and makes things better".
It was instrumental in the promotion of the concept of inclusive design.

The Design Council's archive is located at the University of Brighton Design Archives.

The Design Council operates two subsidiaries, the Design Council Commission for Architecture and the Built Environment (Design Council CABE) and Design Council Enterprises Limited.

The Commission for Architecture and the Built Environment 
The Design Council Commission for Architecture and the Built Environment (DC CABE, alternatively Design Council CABE, CABE at the Design Council, or simply CABE), is one of Design Council's two subsidiaries. It supports communities, local authorities and developers involved in built environment projects by providing services in three areas: design review, customised expert support, and training and continued professional development (CPD). These services are supported by a network of Built Environment Experts (BEEs), a multidisciplinary team of 250 experts from “architecture, planning and infrastructure backgrounds, as well as academics, health specialists, and community engagement workers”.

Design Council CABE, which is intended to operate as a self-sustaining business, was formed on 1 April 2011 with about 20 staff from the original CABE after it was merged with the Design Council. The BEE network was formed in 2012.

History 
The Design Council began on 19 December 1944 as the Council of Industrial Design (COID), founded by Hugh Dalton, President of the Board of Trade in the wartime Government. Its objective was 'to promote by all practicable means the improvement of design in the products of British industry'.

S. C. Leslie, the council's first director, played an important part in the Britain Can Make It exhibition of 1946. His 1947 successor Sir Gordon Russell established the organisational model for the next 40 years. Under Sir Paul Reilly the organisation changed its name to the Design Council in 1972.

The Design Council was incorporated as a registered charity by royal charter in 1976, although it continued to operate as a non-departmental public body.

In December 1994 it was restructured, resulting in a functional change from being both an advisory body and a provider of goods and services to a primarily strategic mission “to inspire the best use of design by the United Kingdom in the world context, in order to improve prosperity and wellbeing”.

On 1 April 2010 it incorporated a subsidiary trading company called Design Council Enterprises Limited to transact “fundraising activities that are not primary-purpose charitable activity.”

On 1 April 2011, it ceased to be a non-departmental public body of the Department for Business, Innovation and Skills and became an independent registered charity, although it continued to receive grants from the department. It also officially merged with the Commission for Architecture and the Built Environment (CABE) on the same day although Design Council CABE was incorporated four days earlier.

In 2017, Design Council appointed Sarah Weir (OBE) as their CEO.

The Design Centre
Sir Gordon Russell, who was heavily involved in the 1951 Festival of Britain, examined ways to reform the education and training of new industrial designers. The Design Centre, in London's Haymarket, was officially opened on 26 April 1956.

The Council under Russell combined exhibitions with product endorsements, direct services to industry, commercial publishing and retail.

After the Design Council's restructuring in 1994, the Design Centre was closed to the public. The Design Council continued to operate from the Design Centre until 1998.

The Design journal 
Between 1949 and 1999, the Design Council published Design, a “well-regarded magazine of its own” The journal ceased publication after the summer issue of 1999.

Awards given 

The council has hosted the British Design Awards, with the 1987 logo rights co-owned with Manchester Metropolitan University. It was suggested in 1995 in Business Strategy Review magazine that the awards made suitable benchmarks, contributing to industrial competitiveness.

See also
Chartered Society of Designers
Royal Institute of British Architects
Prince Philip Designers Prize
Design Museum

Notes

References

External links

 Official website
 Design Council Archive, University of Brighton Design Archives
 Design Council YouTube channel

 
British design
Department for Business, Innovation and Skills
Design institutions
Industrial design
Organizations established in 1944
Charities based in England
Compasso d'Oro Award recipients